The 2021–22 season is Buriram United's 10th season in the Thai League. (12th if including P.E.A.'s two seasons) The club will participate in the top-level league. They will also participate in two domestic cups, FA Cup and League Cup.

Club information

Squad information

Transfers

In 
 Pre-season 

 Mid-season

Out 

Pre-season

 Mid-season

Loan Return 
 Pre-season

 Mid-season

Loan Out 

 Pre-season

 Mid-season

Competitions

Overview

Thai League

League table

Results overview

Matches

FA Cup

League Cup

AFC Champions League

Play-off round

Statistics

Appearances
Players with no appearances are not included in the list.

|-
! colspan=14 | Left club during the season

Goalscorers
Includes all competitive matches. The list is sorted by shirt number when total goals are equal. 
 Player who left the club during the season.

Clean sheets

Notes

References

External links
 Club website
 Thai League

Buriram
Buriram United F.C. seasons